The yellow-bridled finch (Melanodera xanthogramma) is a species of bird in the family Thraupidae found in Argentina and Chile.

Distribution and habitat
Its natural habitat is high-altitude grassland, from the tropical in the north to the sub-Antarctic region of Tierra del Fuego and Cape Horn in the south.

Description
The male is mostly yellow and grey with black markings around the face and neck. The female and juvenile are a mottled slightly yellowish grey.

Diet and behaviour
Little is known about their behaviour and feeding habits, as they have only begun to be seriously studied in recent years.

References

yellow-bridled finch
Birds of the Southern Andes
Birds of Patagonia
yellow-bridled finch
yellow-bridled finch
Taxonomy articles created by Polbot